This article shows the rosters of all participating teams at the men's handball tournament at the 2016 Summer Olympics in Rio de Janeiro.

Age, caps and goals as of the start of the tournament, 7 August 2016.

Group A

Argentina
The following is the Argentine roster in the men's handball tournament of the 2016 Summer Olympics.

Head coach: Eduardo Gallardo

Croatia
The following is the Croatian roster in the men's handball tournament of the 2016 Summer Olympics.

Head coach: Željko Babić

Denmark
The following is the Danish roster in the men's handball tournament of the 2016 Summer Olympics.

Head coach:  Guðmundur Guðmundsson

France
The following is the French roster in the men's handball tournament of the 2016 Summer Olympics.

Head coach: Claude Onesta

Qatar
The following is the Qatari roster in the men's handball tournament of the 2016 Summer Olympics.

Head coach:  Valero Rivera López

Tunisia
The following is the Tunisian roster in the men's handball tournament of the 2016 Summer Olympics.

Head coach: Hafedh Zouabi

Group B

Brazil
The following is the Brazilian roster in the men's handball tournament of the 2016 Summer Olympics.

Head coach:  Jordi Ribera

Egypt
The following is the Egyptian roster in the men's handball tournament of the 2016 Summer Olympics.

Head coach: Marwan Ragab

Germany
The following is the German roster in the men's handball tournament of the 2016 Summer Olympics. Steffen Weinhold replaced Patrick Groetzki on 10 August 2016.

Head coach: Dagur Sigurðsson

Poland
The following is the Polish roster in the men's handball tournament of the 2016 Summer Olympics.

Head coach:  Talant Duyshebaev

Slovenia
The following is the Slovenian roster in the men's handball tournament of the 2016 Summer Olympics. The caps and goals are updated as of 17 August 2016.

Head coach:  Veselin Vujović

Sweden
The following is the Swedish roster in the men's handball tournament of the 2016 Summer Olympics. Albin Lagergren replaced Johan Jakobsson on 15 August 2016.

Head coaches: Ola Lindgren and Staffan Olsson

Statistics

Player representation by club
Clubs with 6 or more players represented are listed.

Player representation by league

Coaches representation by country
Coaches in bold represent their own country.

See also
Handball at the 2016 Summer Olympics – Women's team rosters

References

External links

Men's team rosters
2016